Steve Brodie may refer to:

Steve Brodie (bridge jumper) (1863–1901), American performer, claimed to have jumped off the Brooklyn Bridge
Steve Brodie (actor) (1919–1992), American film actor
Steve Brodie (baseball) (1868–1935), American baseball player
Steve Brodie (footballer) (born 1973), English footballer
Steve Brodie (record executive) (1927–2004), American record label owner and founder
Steve Brodie (activist), Depression-era activist in Bloody Sunday (1938)

See also
Bernard Beryl Brodie (1907–1989), British biochemist and pharmacologist